Rudolph Bond (October 10, 1912 – March 29, 1982) was an American actor who was active from 1947 until his death.  His work spanned Broadway, films and television.

Early life
Bond was born in Philadelphia, Pennsylvania, the second youngest of five children.  He was raised in urban Philadelphia by his mother.  He was educated in Philadelphia schools, and eventually received a BA degree from Central High, the only school in the nation certificated to grant such degrees.

Bond was introduced to the world of acting at the age of 16.  He was playing basketball with a group of friends when Julie Sutton, the director of a city amateur acting group (Neighborhood Players, which performed in the same building as the basketball area) approached the group and asked if anybody wanted to be in an upcoming play.  He volunteered, and acted in several plays before leaving Philadelphia to join the United States Army.  He spent four years in the army, was wounded while serving in World War II, and returned to Philadelphia upon his discharge.

Acting career
He continued acting in the Neighborhood Players until 1945, when he won second prize in the John Golden Award for Actors, which allowed him to enroll in Elia Kazan's Actors Studio in New York City.  Kazan got him a substantial role in two stage productions.  After his success in the second (A Streetcar Named Desire), he was invited to Hollywood to recreate his stage role in the movie version. In 1951 he appeared in "Romeo and Juliet" at the Broadhurst Theatre in New York and in 1960 he toured in "Fiorello" (which starred Tom Bosley). He spent the next thirty years bouncing between California and New York, and between movie and television work.

Personal life
Bond met Alma Halbert when she auditioned for a Neighborhood Players role. He was 25, she was 15. They were married in 1948. They had three children: fraternal twins Jonathan and Janet [Mrs. Brill], and Zane.

Alma went on to have a successful career on her own, as an analytical psychologist and author.  She published sixteen books, and numerous articles both about psychiatry and about her Hollywood experiences.

Rudy Bond died of a heart attack in Denver, Colorado, outside the box office of a theater where the next day he was scheduled to begin appearing in a production of What the Babe Said (he was to portray Babe Ruth).

Bond wrote an autobiography but it was not completed before he died.  Alma completed it, added an introduction, and had it published in 2000.

Acting credits

Film

1950: With These Hands - Business Agent (uncredited)
1951: A Streetcar Named Desire - Steve Hubbell
1953: Miss Sadie Thompson - Pvt. Hodges
1954: On The Waterfront - Moose
1957: Nightfall - Red
1957: 12 Angry Men - Judge (uncredited)
1957: The Brothers Rico - Charlie Gonzales
1957: The Hard Man - John Rodman
1958: Run Silent, Run Deep - Sonarman 1st Class Cullen
1959: Middle of the Night - Gould
1960: Because They're Young - Chris
1960: The Mountain Road - Sgt. Miller
1960: BUtterfield 8 - Big Man (uncredited)
1970: Hercules in New York - Ship's Captain
1970: Move - Detective Sawyer
1971: Who Is Harry Kellerman and Why Is He Saying Those Terrible Things About Me? - News Dealer
1971: Mr. Forbush and the Penguins - 3rd Pilot
1972: The Godfather - Don Carmine Cuneo
1974: The Super Cops - Policeman (uncredited)
1974: The Taking of Pelham One Two Three - Phil, Police Commissioner
1979: The Rose - Monty

Television credits
Bond appeared in over 100 TV shows.  Episodes in which he is credited include:

1952:  2 series
1954:  2 series
1955:  2 series
1956:  6 series
1957:  2 series
1958:  5 series
1959:  3 series
1961:  1 series
1962:  1 series
1963:  5 series
1964:  3 series
1966:  1 series
1967:  1 series
1969:  2 series
1973:  1 series
1974:  2 series
1976:  1 series
1977:  2 series
1978:  3 series
1979:  3 series

New York stage credits
1947:  O'Daniel
       A Streetcar Named Desire
1950:  The Bird Cage
1951:  Romeo and Juliet
       Glad Tidings
1952:  Golden Boy
       Fiorello!
       After the Fall
1967:  Illya Darling
1968:  A Mother's Kisses
1972:  Night Watch

References

External links
 
 
 

1912 births
1982 deaths
Male actors from Philadelphia
American male film actors
American male stage actors
American male television actors
Writers from Pennsylvania
United States Army personnel of World War II
20th-century American male actors